Sarapanahalli Lakshmaiah Dharme Gowda (16 December 1955 – 28 December 2020) was an Indian politician from Karnataka state, belonging to Janata Dal (Secular) party. He was Deputy Chairman and Member of the Karnataka Legislative Council.

On December 29, 2020, Dharme Gowda was found dead on a railway track in Karnataka’s Chikamagaluru district.

Police have found the suicide note which more likely looks like a Property Will wherein Dharme Gowda apologized to his mom and his wife, and recorded insights concerning his property and gave other monetary information, encouraging his relatives to finish the new house which was under construction. The case is currently under Investigation.

References

1955 births
2020 deaths
Janata Dal (Secular) politicians
Members of the Karnataka Legislative Council
Deputy Chairpersons of Karnataka Legislative Council